Construct (psychology), also hypothetical construct or psychological construct, is a tool used to facilitate understanding of human behavior. A psychological construct is a label for a domain of behaviors. Behavioral sciences use constructs such as conscientiousness, intelligence, political power, self-esteem, and group culture. For example, if a student sees another sitting in a classroom before an examination biting her nails and fidgeting, the interpretation might be that she is experiencing anxiety. In that case, anxiety is a construct that underlies the behavior that is observed. Cognitive psychologists view constructs as hypothesized causes for certain behaviors, whereas behavioral psychologists view constructs as only descriptors of behaviors. A construct derives its name from the fact that it is a mental construction, derived from scientific process: observing natural phenomena, inferring the common features of those observations, and constructing a label for the commonality or the underlying cause. A construct derives its scientific value from the shared meaning it represents for different people. If a construct is clearly articulated and the phenomena it encompasses are clearly defined, it becomes a useful conceptual tool that facilitates communication. Once defined, constructs become objects of conceptual scrutiny in their own right. Constructs summarize behavioral domains. Constructs are the building blocks of scientific theories.

See also
Construct validity
Mental image

References 

Psychological concepts